The 2017–18 Ligue 2 (referred to as the Domino's Ligue 2 for sponsorship reasons) season was the 79th season since its establishment.

Teams

There are 20 clubs in the league, with three promoted teams from Championnat National replacing the three teams that were relegated from Ligue 2 following the 2016–17 season. All clubs that secured Ligue 2 status for the season were subject to approval by the DNCG before becoming eligible to participate.

Team changes

Promoted from 2016–17 Championnat National
Quevilly-Rouen
Châteauroux
Paris FC

Relegated from 2016–17 Ligue 1
Nancy
Lorient

Promoted to 2017–18 Ligue 1
Troyes
Amiens
Strasbourg

Relegated to 2017–18 Championnat National
Laval
Red Star

Stadia and locations

Personnel and kits 

1Subject to change during the season.

Managerial changes

League table

Results

Promotion play-offs
A promotion play-off competition was held at the end of the season, involving the 3rd, 4th and 5th-placed teams in 2017–18 Ligue 2, and the 18th-placed team in 2017–18 Ligue 1.

The quarter-final was played on 15 May, the semi-final on 18 May and the final on 23 and 27 May 2018.

Quarter-final

Semi-final

Notes

Relegation play-offs
A relegation play-off was held at the end of the season between the 18th-placed Ligue 2 team and the 3rd-placed team of 2017–18 Championnat National. This was played over two legs on 22 and 27 May 2018.

Grenoble are promoted to 2018–19 Ligue 2

Top scorers

Number of teams by regions

References

External links

 Official site 

Ligue 2 seasons
2
France